"Memories" is a 1968 song originally recorded by Elvis Presley.

It was written by Billy Strange and Mac Davis specially for Presley to perform on Elvis, his comeback TV special that would air on NBC on December 3, 1968. Later Mac Davis recalled to Billboard: "They had asked for a song about looking back over the years, and oddly enough, I had to write it in one night. I stayed up all night at Billy Strange's house in Los Angeles. He had a little office set up in his garage. I wrote it right there."

Released in the United States in 1969 accompanied by "Charro", the title song from the movie Charro!, on the B-side, "Memories" reached number 35 on the Billboard Hot 100 for the week of April 12, 1969.

The song is also included on the album Elvis, the soundtrack album for the NBC TV special at which it was first performed. For the TV show itself the song was recorded live, but the album features a studio version recorded on June 24.

The book Rock Song Index: The 7500 Most Important Songs for the Rock and Roll Era calls the song "Memories" the "hallmark of Elvis' later period".

Charts 
Elvis Presley

The Lettermen (medley)

Re-release 
On December 1, 1970, the single was re-released as part of RCA Victor's Gold Standard Series (together with 9 other Presley's singles).

Cover versions 
 In late 1969, The Lettermen recorded a medley of "Memories" with "Traces" which missed the U.S. Top 40 but reached number three on the Easy Listening chart.
 Nancy Sinatra recorded a cover version in 1969, for her album Nancy on Reprise Records.
 The Free Design covered the song on their 1969 album Heaven/Earth.

References

External links 
 "Charro / Memories" at Discogs

1968 songs
1969 singles
Elvis Presley songs
The Lettermen songs
RCA Victor singles
Capitol Records singles
Songs written by Billy Strange
Songs written by Mac Davis
Songs about nostalgia